Lakis Georgiou (born 26 March 1938) is a Greek former sports shooter. He competed in the skeet event at the 1972 Summer Olympics.

References

1938 births
Living people
Greek male sport shooters
Olympic shooters of Greece
Shooters at the 1972 Summer Olympics
Place of birth missing (living people)
20th-century Greek people